Charlie Hurst (25 January 1919 – 23 January 1999) was an English footballer who played as a centre half for various clubs including Bristol Rovers, Oldham Athletic and Rochdale.

Playing career
Hurst was born in Denton, Lancashire and started his football career with Hyde United in the 1930s before playing for Bristol Rovers, Oldham Athletic and Rochdale. The Second World War, which took the best years of his footballing career, saw him serve in the British Army and he was one of the many soldiers rescued during the Dunkirk Evacuation in 1940. After the war had finished he returned to play for Oldham and then Rochdale before moving south, ending his footballing career playing non-league football for Chelmsford City and Sudbury Town.

He played in one match for Mossley, scoring a goal in the 1947–48 season.

Hurst became player-manager of Sudbury in the 1950–51 season. He took the team to the final of the Suffolk Senior Cup and third place in the Essex & Suffolk Border League.

Personal life
Hurst was the father of England player and World Cup winner, Geoff Hurst. 
After finishing playing football he worked as a toolmaker in Essex. He died two days before his 80th birthday in 1999.

References

1919 births
1999 deaths
People from Denton, Greater Manchester
English footballers
English Football League players
Hyde United F.C. players
Rochdale A.F.C. players
Oldham Athletic A.F.C. players
Bristol Rovers F.C. players
Chelmsford City F.C. players
Sudbury Town F.C. players
Halstead Town F.C. managers
Association football central defenders
English football managers
Mossley A.F.C. players
British Army soldiers
British Army personnel of World War II
Military personnel from Lancashire